The German Luftwaffe (Air Force), Heer (Army), Kriegsmarine (Navy) and the Waffen-SS used Arabic numerals as well as Roman numerals to distinguish between the different units, sub-units and organization levels of their respective military branch.

Luftwaffe flying units
Arabic numerals denoted a Staffel (Squadron) of a Geschwader (Flying Wing).
Example: 2./Jagdgeschwader 51 refers to the 2nd Staffel of the 51st Jagdgeschwader.
Roman numerals denoted a Gruppe (Group) of a Geschwader.
Example: III./Zerstörergeschwader 26 refers to the 3rd Gruppe of the 26th Zerstörergeschwader.

Units of the Heer or Waffen-SS
The Heer or Waffen-SS used a similar naming convention to the Luftwaffe. An Infantry, Panzer, Grenadier division was normally composed of three regiments. Each of these regiments was composed of three battalions denoted by Roman numerals. Each battalion was composed of three companies which were numbered by Arabic numerals. This naming scheme also applied to land based units of the Kriegsmarine, Luftwaffe and the Waffen-SS.

See also
Glossary of German military terms

References
Citations

Bibliography

 Obermaier, Ernst (1976). Die Ritterkreuzträger der Luftwaffe 1939-1945 Band II Stuka- und Schlachtflieger (in German). Mainz, Germany: Verlag Dieter Hoffmann. .
 Scherzer, Veit (2007). Die Ritterkreuzträger 1939–1945 Die Inhaber des Ritterkreuzes des Eisernen Kreuzes 1939 von Heer, Luftwaffe, Kriegsmarine, Waffen-SS, Volkssturm sowie mit Deutschland verbündeter Streitkräfte nach den Unterlagen des Bundesarchives (in German). Jena, Germany: Scherzers Miltaer-Verlag. .

Military of Nazi Germany